Henrik Lax (born Rolf Henrik Richard Lax on 6 May 1946 in Helsinki) is a Finnish politician and former
Member of the European Parliament with the Swedish People's Party, Member of the Bureau of the Alliance of Liberals and Democrats for Europe and sat on the European Parliament's Committee on Civil Liberties, Justice and Home Affairs.

Lax was a substitute for the Committee on the Environment, Public Health and Food Safety, a member of the Delegation to the EU-Russia Parliamentary Cooperation Committee and a substitute for the Delegation to the EU-Moldova Parliamentary Cooperation Committee.

Lax was the Swedish People's Party's candidate in the 2006 presidential election. He finished 7th out of the 8 candidates, with a vote share of 1.6% (48,703 votes). After the first round, he joined the other centre-right candidates in expressing his support for Sauli Niinistö in the runoff election between Niinistö and Tarja Halonen.

Lax has argued that Finland would be better off if it sought membership of the North Atlantic Treaty Organization. He has argued that the time is now, and the option would not be available if the current peaceful situation changed.

Education 
 1967: English and comparative law, City of London College
 1969: Degree in law from Helsinki University
 1972: Deputy district judge
 1973: Degree in economics, Hanken School of Economics in Helsinki
 1980: Management, Institute of Leadership, Stockholm

Career 
 1969-1971: Research assistant with the national social science commission
 1969-1972: Court practice, lawyer and prosecution
 1971-1973: Industry's committee on taxation, legal expert and secretary
 1973-1987: Oy Tampella Ab
 legal expert, board and management secretary
 head of subsidiary management
 head of textile industry's tarpaulin sector
 assistant director responsible for Group information activities and management training
 since 1988: Governing board of life insurance company Suomi
 since 1995: Governing board of Alko
 Chairman of the Board of Celemi, Finland (learning solutions and projects for change in large corporate organisations)
 1987-2004: Member of Finnish Parliament for the Swedish People's Party 
 1991-2003: Chairman of Committee on Civil Law
 1995-2004: Vice-Chairman of the parliamentary group
 2000-2004: Member of the parliamentary Committee on Foreign Affairs
 Vice-Chairman of the parliamentary Committee on Foreign Affairs (2000, 2002,-2003)
 2003-2004: Member of the parliamentary Committee on the Constitution
 2002-2004: Member of the monitoring group on security policy set up by Prime Minister Paavo Lipponen
 1993-2005: Chairman of the Swedish Assembly of Finland
 Military rank: Captain
 Officer corps, French Legion of Honour
 Knight First Class of the Order of the White Rose of Finland

See also
 2004 European Parliament election in Finland

Trivia 
Lax means salmon in Swedish

References

External links
 
 
 

1946 births
Living people
Politicians from Helsinki
Swedish People's Party of Finland politicians
Members of the Parliament of Finland (1987–91)
Members of the Parliament of Finland (1991–95)
Members of the Parliament of Finland (1995–99)
Members of the Parliament of Finland (1999–2003)
Members of the Parliament of Finland (2003–07)
Swedish People's Party of Finland MEPs
MEPs for Finland 2004–2009
Officiers of the Légion d'honneur
Candidates for President of Finland